CEIP stands for

 Customer Experience Improvement Program, a Microsoft  customer-experience management initiative, also known as SQM (Software Quality Metrics)
 Carnegie Endowment for International Peace
 Centro de Educación Infantil y Primaria, Spanish state primary school